Nec temere, nec timide is a Latin phrase that translates to 'Neither rashly nor timidly'. Its exact origin is unknown although Aristotle in Ethica Nicomachea, Book III, mentions, along with other examples, that the virtuous man is not temerarious nor timorous, but courageous. It is best known as the motto of the Dano-Norwegian naval hero Niels Juel, who supposedly used it first at the dawn of July 1, 1677, just before the Battle of Køge Bay.

The phrase has been used as a motto by armigerous families such as Bent, Buckley and Sherbourne, as well as individuals including the Williams-Bulkeley baronets and Charles Western, 1st Baron Western.

Today, it is used as a motto by various institutions, including:
 The Royal Danish Naval Academy
 The former English borough of Oswestry, in Shropshire
 Gdańsk
 The Dutch air assault brigade 11th Airmobile Brigade (Netherlands).
 Appleby College
 Cottrell Old Yankee Ale
 The Michigan Exploration Laboratory
 The Royal Quebec Golf Club
 The Bulkeley Hotel, Beaumaris
 National Paramount Services, LLP, US
 Free City of Danzig, 1920–1939
 Free City of Danzig Government in Exile

References

External link

Latin mottos
Latin words and phrases